Black Cadillac may refer to:

Black Cadillac (film), 2003 American thriller/horror film
Black Cadillac List of Ray Donovan episodes
Black Cadillac (album), album by Rosanne Cash
"Black Cadillac", song by Shinedown from Threat to Survival
"Black Cadillac", song by Lightnin' Hopkins 1961
"Black Cadillacs", song by Modest Mouse from Good News for People Who Love Bad News
"Two Black Cadillacs", a song by Carrie Underwood